The Aronson Prize is a prize awarded for achievements in microbiology and immunology. It was established by the will of the pediatrician and bacteriologist Hans Aronson and has been awarded since 1921. Aronson bequeathed a large part of his estate to the establishment of the prize. The prize is awarded biannually on 8 March, the date of Aronson's death.

In 1969, the foundation that awarded the prize was dissolved on the initiative of its last chairman Georg Henneberg, and the responsibility for the prize and the remaining capital was transferred to the (West) Berlin government, in order to safeguard the existence of the prize. Since 1970, the prize has been awarded by the Senate of Berlin.

The first laureate was August von Wassermann. Among the Aronson laureates are several scientists who later were awarded the Nobel Prize in Physiology or Medicine, such as Karl Landsteiner and Gerhard Domagk.

Laureates

 1921 August von Wassermann
 1926 Karl Landsteiner

 1931 Richard Otto

 1944 Gerhard Domagk
 1956 Helmut Ruska

 1960 Paul Hans Karl Constantin Schmidt

 1966  Peter Giesbrecht
 1967  Albert Herrlich
 1968 Friedrich Staib

 1971 or 1972 Werner Köhler
 1971 or 1972  Werner Schäfer
 1973 Ernst Richard Habermann

 1977 Werner Knapp

 1981 Walter Doerfler
 1982 Volker Schirrmacher

 1985 Volker ter Meulen

 1987 Karin Mölling
 1988 Stefan H. E. Kaufmann
 1989 Hans-Dieter Klenk
 1990 Dieter Bitter-Suermann
 1991 Bernhard Fleckenstein
 1992 Stefan Carl Wilhelm Meuer
 1993 Ulrich Koszinowski
 1994 Thomas Hünig
 1995 Otto Haller
 1996 Thomas F. Meyer
 1997 Bernhard Fleischer
 1998 Jürgen Heesemann
 1999 Ernst Theodor Rietschel
 2000 Andreas Radbruch
 2001 Sucharit Bhakdi
 2002 Wolfgang Hammerschmidt

 2007 Matthias Reddehase
 2008 Matthias Frosch

See also

 List of medicine awards

References 

German science and technology awards
Medicine awards